Robert of Braybrooke or Robert le May (1168–1210) was a medieval landowner, justice and sheriff.

Biography
He was born at Braybrooke, Northamptonshire the son of justiciar Ingebald de Braybrooke and his wife Albreda de Neumarche.

Le May accumulated more land in several counties by paying off the mortgages of people in financial difficulties. he was responsible for the building of Braybrooke Castle, a fortified manor house.

He served as a justiciar in 100 and 1207. He was appointed High Sheriff of Bedfordshire and Buckinghamshire (1206–1212), High Sheriff of Northamptonshire (1209–1212) and High Sheriff of Rutland (1211–1214). He was also appointed by King John as Master of the Great Wardrobe and a member of the king's council. He was listed with his son Henry by Roger of Wendover among King John's evil counsellors.

Le May died in 1210 and was succeeded by his eldest son Henry, who also became a sheriff, sometimes sharing the post with his father. His other son was Gerard.

Notes

References
 Braybrooke Castle

High Sheriffs of Bedfordshire
High Sheriffs of Buckinghamshire
High Sheriffs of Northamptonshire
High Sheriffs of Rutland